This is a list of current and former Roman Catholic churches in the Roman Catholic Archdiocese of Chicago. The archdiocese covers Cook and Lake Counties and is organized for administrative purposes into six vicariates as follows:

 Vicariate I: Lake County and northern Cook County (including Des Plaines, Mount Prospect, Schaumburg, and Waukegan)
 Vicariate II: Chicago and Lakeshore north (including Chicago, Evanston, Skokie, and Winnetka)
 Vicariate III: Central Chicago
 Vicariate IV: West Cook County (including Chicago, Cicero, Melrose Park, and Oak Park)
 Vicariate V: South and southwest Cook County  (including Chicago, Lemont, Oak Lawn, and Orland Park)
 Vicariate VI: South and southeast Cook County (including south Chicago, Blue Island, and Harvey)

Vicariate I

Vicariate I covers the northern portion of the archdiocese, covers Lake County and portions of Cook County.  It includes the communities of Des Plaines, Elk Grove Village, Lake Forest, Mount Prospect, Mundelein, Schaumburg, and Waukegan. A list of churches in these communities is found at List of churches in the Roman Catholic Archdiocese of Chicago – Vicariate I.

Vicariate II

Deanery A: Evanston and Skokie

Deanery B: Chicago

Deanery C: Chicago

Deanery D: Chicago

Deanery E: Niles and Park Ridge

Deanery F: Chicago

Vicariate III

Deanery A: Chicago

Deanery B: Chicago

Deanery C: Chicago

Deanery D: Chicago

Deanery E: Chicago

Vicariate IV

Deanery A: Chicago

Deanery B: Melrose Park & Oak Park

Deanery C: Berwyn & Cicero

Deanery D: Chicago & Schiller Park

Deanery E: LaGrange and Riverside

Vicariate V

Deanery A: Chicago

Deanery B: Chicago

Deanery C: Chicago, Evergreen

Deanery D: Oak Lawn

Deanery E: Lemont, Orland Park, Tinley Park

Vicariate VI

Deanery A: South Side, Chicago

Deanery B: Chicago

Deanery C: Chicago

Deanery D: Blue Island, Calumet City, Chicago Heights, Harvey, South Holland

Other

References

Chicago